The channel shiner (Notropis wickliffi) is a species of ray-finned fish in the genus Notropis. It is endemic to the United States where it is widespread in the Mississippi River basin, including the  Missouri, Ohio, Arkansas, and Tennessee rivers and the lower portions of their tributaries.

References 

 

Notropis
Fish described in 1931